Cerithideopsilla is a genus of medium-sized sea snails or mud snails, marine gastropod mollusks in the family Potamididae, the horn snails.

Species
There are altogether 16 species within Cerithideopsilla, but as of January 2015 only four species are formally described:
 Cerithideopsilla alata (Philippi, 1849)
 Cerithideopsilla cingulata (Gmelin, 1791)
 Cerithideopsilla conica (Blainville, 1829)
 Cerithideopsilla incisa (Hombron & Jacquinot, 1848) - synonym: Cerithideopsilla djadjariensis (K. Martin, 1899)

Species brought into synonymy
 Cerithideopsilla microptera (Kiener, 1842) is a synonym of Cerithidea microptera (Kiener, 1842)

References

External links

Potamididae